is a fictional character which serves as the mascot for Nagoya Municipal Subway.

Inspiration

The character has a human form wearing the uniform of an employee of Nagoya City Subway, with the head of a Shachihoko, a mythical character which is often used to represent Nagoya. In particular, Nagoya Castle is famous for its large, golden figures of Shachihoko. The name is a combination of the "shachi" in Shachihoko and the "hachi" in Maruhachi, which is the official symbol of Nagoya.

References

External links
 Hatchii's official web page 

Fish mascots
Nagoya Municipal Subway